Alfred Kennedy may refer to:

 Alfred Kennedy (British Army officer) (1870–1926), British general
 Alfred J. Kennedy (1878–1944), American politician from New York
 Alfred Ravenscroft Kennedy (1879–1943), British politician